Florian Hube (born 30 September 1980) is a German retired football player. He made his professional debut in the 1999–2000 season for SpVgg Greuther Fürth in the 2. Fußball-Bundesliga.

References

1980 births
Living people
German footballers
Association football defenders
Füchse Berlin Reinickendorf players
SpVgg Greuther Fürth players
Hertha BSC II players
2. Bundesliga players
Footballers from Berlin